La Zaida is a municipality located in the province of Zaragoza, Aragon, Spain. According to the 2009 census (INE), the municipality has a population of 534 inhabitants.

See also
Ribera Baja del Ebro

References

External links 

La Zaida Town Hall - Official Site

Municipalities in the Province of Zaragoza